Puran Badi is a village in the Dhod Panchayat Samitii in the Sikar District of Rajasthan region in India. It is 12 kilometers southwest of Sikar.

There are three government schools in the village: a secondary school and two primary schools. There is a general hospital and an internet room in Puran Badi.

Demographics

The total population of the village was estimated in 2011 as 2591, comprising 1451 males and 1140 females.

Villages in Sikar district